Robert "Bob" Bernhardt is an American conductor.  He is currently in his 24th season as Principal Pops Conductor of the Louisville Orchestra (and in his 40th consecutive season there), and in his 10th season as Music Director Emeritus and Principal Pops Conductor of the Chattanooga Symphony and Opera (where he was Music Director for 19 seasons).  In 2015, Bob Bernhardt was named Principal Pops Conductor of the Grand Rapids Symphony.  He is also Artist-in-Residence at Lee University since 2012.  For most of the 1980s, he was also associate conductor of the Louisville Orchestra.

Born in Rochester, New York, Robert Bernhardt holds a master's degree from the University of Southern California Thornton School of Music, where he studied with Daniel Lewis. He is also a Phi Beta Kappa, summa cum laude graduate of Union College in Schenectady, New York, where he was an Academic All-American Baseball Player.

Career highlights 
Formerly, he was Principal Conductor/Artistic Director of the Rochester Philharmonic, Music Director and Conductor of the Tucson Symphony, Principal Guest Conductor of Kentucky Opera, Music Director and Conductor of the Amarillo Symphony, and Artistic Director of the Lake Placid Sinfonietta.

The 2015 season marks his 22nd as a frequent guest of the Boston Pops, which he first conducted at John Williams’ invitation in 1992. Along with Boston, he has been a frequent guest conductor of the Edmonton Symphony Orchestra (approaching his 14th season as conductor of their Symphony Under the Sky Festival), the Baltimore Symphony, the Detroit Symphony, the Cincinnati Pops, the Pittsburgh Symphony, the Dallas Symphony, the Houston Symphony, the Seattle Symphony, the Pacific Symphony, the Florida Orchestra, the Las Vegas Philharmonic, and the Santa Barbara Symphony. He has been a guest with the St. Louis Symphony, Virginia Symphony, Phoenix Symphony, and many others.

In the world of pops, he was worked with scores of stars from Broadway, Rock & Roll, and the American Songbook, from Brian Stokes Mitchell and Kelli O’Hara, to the Beach Boys and Wynonna, to Jason Alexander and Ann Hampton Callaway.

He conducted productions with Kentucky Opera for 18 consecutive seasons, and for 19 seasons with his own company in Chattanooga, as well as many guest conducting engagements with the Nashville Opera.

References

External links
 Louisville Orchestra official website
 Chattanooga Symphony & Opera official website
Grand Rapids Symphony official website

American male conductors (music)
Living people
Musicians from Rochester, New York
Year of birth missing (living people)
Union College (New York) alumni
USC Thornton School of Music alumni
Classical musicians from New York (state)
21st-century American conductors (music)
21st-century American male musicians